Liu Yu (born 24 December 1975) is a Chinese writer and political scientist. She is an associate professor of political science at Tsinghua University in Beijing. A prominent spokeswoman for Chinese liberalism, Liu's book , an introduction of the workings of American democracy to a Chinese audience, was acclaimed as a creative and well-written cornerstone of the ideological movement.

Early life and career
Liu was born 24 December 1975 in Poyang County, Jiangxi. She received her Bachelor's and Master's degrees in political science from Renmin University of China in Beijing's Haidian District in 1996 and 1999 respectively. From 2000 to 2007, she lived in the United States, where she attained a PhD in political science from Columbia University and was a postdoctoral researcher at Harvard University in the Fairbank Center for Chinese Studies. From 2007 to 2010, she was a lecturer at the University of Cambridge.

Liu began blogging about and discussing politics online in 2000. She emerged as a writer of web fiction in the early 2000s, serialising her novel Lonely as a Planet in 2003; the work became popular amongst American internet readers. Lonely as a Planet and her later work So, Where is Love? were later published in China to little acclaim. In 2004, she began writing political commentary in the Chinese media under the pseudonym "Drunken Piano". Liu developed a reputation as a "cynical, angry youth" who drew a significant fanbase. Commentators also described her writing style as unusual for a female author. Nonetheless, Liu shunned media attention, going as far as to call seeking a fanbase "shameful".

Breakthrough and academic career
In 2009, Liu published , a collection of essays originally written for her blog on the subject of American democracy. The book aspired to introduce the daily mechanisms of democracy to a Chinese audience, explaining processes such as the passing of bills and the practice of labour strikes from a relatable position of stories and anecdotes, rather than "abstract jargon". Details of Democracy became a bestseller and made Liu famous, gaining her a reputation as "China's de Tocqueville". It became a cornerstone of Chinese liberal thought, respected for its open support of democracy couched in "creative allusions, roundabout references, and ironic wit" to avoid suppression by the Chinese Communist Party. Liu's view of the United States was compared to Voltaire's impression of China, both seeing in foreign empires embodiments of the values missing in their homelands.

Liu became an associate professor of political science at Tsinghua University, the highest-ranked university in Asia, in 2010. She cultivated a reputation as "one of China's best-known America-watchers" and became a popular public speaker as one of the faces of Chinese liberalism. Throughout the late 2000s and early 2010s, Liu took an optimistic view of Chinese democratisation, predicting a radical democratic shift in the next decade. Contrary to her expectations, China grew more authoritarian over the 2010s; this had consequences for Liu's career, as the increased repression of liberal voices impeded her ability to land speaking roles or teach her positions. She told Ian Johnson that this was a chilling effect of government censorship, but that it should not be interpreted as the failure of the "Internet Spring" entirely, and that the full consequences of China's 2000s liberalism were yet to be seen.

In 2012, Temple University assistant professor of communications Xu Kaibin, later a professor of journalism at Wuhan University, published a criticism of Liu's academic career on the nationalist news site Guancha. Xu accused Liu of having few peer-reviewed publications and of being less academically accomplished than expected for Tsinghua faculty, or indeed for Tsinghua graduate students. Liu responded by arguing that Xu's assessment of her papers was out of date, and that he was overapplying publication counts expected in other fields to her own; she also stated that while her publication count was relatively low for tenure-track faculty, it was understandable in the context that she also blogged, taught a high teaching load, and moved across three continents in six years. Liu and her husband  also criticised Xu for insinuating that Liu had misrepresented her tenure-track lecturing position at Cambridge, which he denied.

Personal life

Though both members of the couple are prominent academics, they avoid discussion of their private life and have made a pact not to appear in the same public appearances. The couple have a daughter.

Selected publications

Articles
Liu Yu (2017), "Lessons of new democracies for China", Journal of Chinese Political Science, vol. 98, no. 3
Liu Yu (2017), "Is there a tradeoff between democratization and stability?", Social Science Quarterly, vol. 98, no. 5
Liu Yu (2016), "The state with a surname", Journal of Chinese Governance, vol. 1, no. 3

Books

References

Writers from Jiangxi
Chinese political scientists
Women political scientists
Chinese bloggers
Chinese women bloggers
Living people
1975 births
Renmin University of China alumni
Columbia Graduate School of Arts and Sciences alumni
Academic staff of Tsinghua University